Ingorola is a small village near Umrala in the Bhavnagar district of Gujarat state, India. It has a population of about 2,000 people. Most of the villagers are farmers, though many work in the diamond cutting and polishing business in the nearby Surat.

References

Villages in Bhavnagar district